Billy Van Heusen (born August 27, 1946) is a former professional football punter and wide receiver who played for the Denver Broncos from 1968 to 1976. On Oct 6, 1968, he tied a franchise record with 12 punts against the Cincinnati Bengals

See also
 List of American Football League players
 Broncos announce all-time Top 100 Team
 Sacco Sez: Billy Van Heusen, Sam Martin and the importance of directional punting
 Broncos Assign Jersey Numbers to 2022 Draft Class

References

1946 births
Living people
American football punters
Denver Broncos (AFL) players
Denver Broncos players
Maryland Terrapins football players
Players of American football from New York (state)
Sportspeople from New Rochelle, New York
American people of Dutch descent